Livona is an unincorporated community in Hazelton Township, Emmons County, North Dakota, United States. It is located on the T-intersection between 63rd Street SW and North Dakota State Highway 1804.

References

 DeLorme (2003). North Dakota Atlas & Gazetteer. Yarmouth, Maine: DeLorme.  

Emmons County, North Dakota